In music theory, the pulse is a series of uniformly spaced beats—either audible or implied that sets the tempo and is the scaffolding for the rhythm. By contrast, rhythm is always audible and can depart from the pulse. So while the rhythm may become too difficult for an untrained listener to fully match, nearly any listener instinctively matches the pulse by simply tapping uniformly, despite rhythmic variations in timing of sounds atop the pulse.

Definitions

The pulse may be audible or implied. The tempo of the piece is the speed of the pulse. If a pulse becomes too fast it would become a drone; one that is too slow would be perceived as unconnected sounds. When the period of any continuous beat is faster than 8–10 per second or slower than 1 per 1.5–2 seconds, it cannot be perceived as such. "Musical" pulses are generally specified in the range 40 to 240 beats per minute. The pulse is not necessarily the fastest or the slowest component of the rhythm but the one that is perceived as basic. This is currently most often designated as a crotchet or quarter note when written (see time signature).

Pulse is related to and distinguished from rhythm (grouping), beats, and meter:

Pulse groups

 
While ideal pulses are identical, when pulses are variously accented, this produces two- or three-pulse pulse groups such as strong-weak and strong-weak-weak and any longer group may be broken into such groups of two and three. In fact there is a natural tendency to perceptually group or differentiate an ideal pulse in this way. A repetitive, regularly accented pulse-group is called a metre. 

Pulses can occur at multiple metric levels - see figure. Pulse groups may be distinguished as synchronous, if all pulses on slower levels coincide with those on faster levels, and nonsynchronous, if not.

An isochronal or equally spaced pulse on one level that uses varied pulse groups (rather than just one pulse group the whole piece) create a pulse on the (slower) multiple level that is non-isochronal (a stream of 2+3... at the eighth note level would create a pulse of a quarter note+dotted quarter note as its multiple level).

See also
 Composite rhythm
 Metre (hymn)
 Metre (poetry)
 Triple metre
 Duple and quadruple metre
 Sextuple metre
 Counting (music)

Sources

Rhythm and meter